José Antonio 'Chechu' Dorado Ramírez (born 10 July 1982) is a Spanish professional footballer who plays as a central defender.

Club career
Born in Córdoba, Andalusia, Dorado alternated between Segunda División and Segunda División B until the age of 29. He started his senior career with Deportivo Aragón, then went on to represent UE Lleida, SD Huesca and Real Betis.

Dorado scored two goals in 33 games in the 2010–11 season to help the latter club to return to La Liga, as champions, after a two-year absence. He made his debut in the competition on 27 August 2011, playing the full 90 minutes in a 1–0 derby away victory over Granada CF. He contributed 2,890 minutes during the campaign as they retained their status, scoring his first goal in the Spanish top flight on 31 March 2012 in another match against a team from his native region, Málaga CF (2–0 away win).

On 22 January 2013, Dorado returned to the second division, joining Villarreal CF. He started in all his 11 league appearances in his first year, going on to achieve another promotion.

On 6 July 2015, Dorado signed a two-year deal with Rayo Vallecano after his contract expired. He scored once from 38 matches in 2017–18, as the side returned to the top tier after the first-place finish.

In January 2019, the 36-year-old Dorado moved to Real Zaragoza. On 13 July that year, he agreed to a contract at third-division SD Ejea.

Career statistics

Honours
Betis
Segunda División: 2010–11

Rayo Vallecano
Segunda División: 2017–18

References

External links

1982 births
Living people
Spanish footballers
Footballers from Córdoba, Spain
Association football defenders
La Liga players
Segunda División players
Segunda División B players
Segunda Federación players
Real Zaragoza B players
UE Lleida players
SD Huesca footballers
Real Betis players
Villarreal CF players
Rayo Vallecano players
Real Zaragoza players
SD Ejea players